Stoneridge Shopping Center is an upscale major shopping mall in Pleasanton, California.  The mall is managed and co-owned by Simon Property Group, and is adjacent to Interstate 680.

The mall is anchored by JCPenney and two Macy's stores - a women's store, and a men's, children's, and home store. Two standalone restaurants - The Cheesecake Factory and P. F. Chang's China Bistro - sit adjacent to the mall.

History
The mall opened in 1980 and is part of the larger Stoneridge master planned neighborhood originally developed by Stoneson Development Corporation, whose founders also developed Lakeside Village and Stonestown Galleria in nearby San Francisco after World War II.

The mall itself was developed by A. Alfred Taubman, who also developed several other shopping malls in the Bay Area, including Eastridge Mall in San Jose, Hilltop Mall in Richmond and Sunvalley Mall in Concord.  The original anchor tenants were Macy's, Emporium-Capwell, and JCPenney.  Nordstrom opened a store in 1990, the same year Emporium-Capwell dropped the double-barrelled name and became simply Emporium.  Six years later, Emporium was acquired by the parent company of Macy's, which elected to keep both locations; the original Macy's store was used for their women's departments and their men's and home furnishings departments were relocated to the former Emporium store. 1996 also saw the construction and opening of a Sears store.

Ownership of Stoneridge was to change in the next few years as the Taubman shopping center interests,  which had become a publicly traded real estate investment trust in 1992, were reorganized in 1998 and the GM Pension Trust assumed full ownership of Stoneridge, retaining Taubman Centers as manager.  In 2004 the GM Pension Trust sold a half interest in a portfolio of shopping centers, including Stoneridge, to The Mills Corporation, which also assumed management of the center. A joint venture led by Simon Property Group purchased The Mills Corp. in 2007, bringing Stoneridge under the Simon banner.

Plans to renovate and expand the property were announced in 2005, calling for the construction of a new, smaller Nordstrom store and the addition of new shops, restaurants, and a cinema within the existing Nordstrom building's footprint. The only portion of the plans to materialize were the addition of two restaurants outside the mall - The Cheesecake Factory and P. F. Chang's China Bistro, both of which opened in 2006.

On October 15, 2018, it was announced that Sears would be closing as part of a plan to close 142 stores nationwide. The department store shuttered in January 2019, paving the way for a planned redevelopment.

On May 7, 2020, it was announced that Nordstrom would not be reopening its store at Stoneridge as part of a plan to close 16 locations due to declining sales. This will leave JCPenney and Macy's as the only anchors left.

References

External links
  Official website

Shopping malls established in 1980
Shopping malls in the San Francisco Bay Area
Pleasanton, California
Simon Property Group
Shopping malls in Alameda County, California
1980 establishments in California